A lang xian, which can be translated as "wolf brush" or "wolf bamboo" was a branched, multi-tipped spear with blades attached to the branches. The blades could be dipped in poison. The lang xian was a weapon well suited for defense, as it would be difficult for an opponent to assault the wielder without risking contact with the blades.

It was probably an invention of the Chinese general Qi Jiguang of the Ming Dynasty, who described it in his manual titled Jixiao Xinshu. The manual describes that the lang xian acted as backup for the rattan shield bearers in a "mandarin duck formation". In Korea, the weapon, known as nangseon, was mentioned as early as the 16th century martial arts manual Muyejebo, which was based on the Jixiao Xinshu. 

Chinese melee weapons
Traditional Korean weapons
Polearms
Spears